Dmitry Aleksandrovich Strelnikov ( [full spelling]); Cossack from the old Cossack family (a descendant of the Siberian Cossacks and the Cossacks of Semirechye), born in a Cossack city Verniy (Alma-Ata, USSR) in 1969 is a Russian and Polish writer, biologist and a journalist for television, radio and the press, living in Poland; the graduate of The Correspondence Course of the Mathematic of the M.V. Lomonosov Moscow State University and of the Biology Department of the Warsaw University.

Bibliography
 2020 – "Глаза Тайги" ("Taiga’s eyes"), a novel, Russia/Moscow, ЭКСМО / EKSMO Edition House.
 2017 – "Polski Petersburg – rosyjska Warszawa. Powrót Heleny" ("Polish Petersburg – Russian Warsaw. Helen's return"), a novel, Poland/Wroclaw, Atut Edition House.
 2011 – "Fajnie być samcem!" ("It's fun being a male"), a novel, Poland/Warsaw, Iskry Edition House.
 2011 – "Złote ryby" ("The Golden Fish"), a novel, Poland/Warsaw, W.A.B. Edition House
 2010 – "Wyspa" ("Island"), a novel, Poland/Warsaw, W.A.B. Edition House
 2009 – "Nikołaj i Bibigul" ("Nikolai and Bibigul"), a novel, Poland/Warsaw, W.A.B. Edition House
 2008 – "Ruski miesiąc" ("Wedding.ru"), a novel, Poland/Warsaw, W.A.B. Edition House
 2007 – "Nocne życie aniołów" ("The night life of the angels"), a collection of essays, Poland/Warsaw, Nowy Świat Edition House
 2006–2007 – "Wielka Encyklopedia Zwierząt" ("A Great Encyclopedy of the Animals") in 30th volumes, Poland, Amer.Com SA with the cooperation with Oxford Educational Encyclopedia Ltd UK.
 2004 – "Homo mirabilis", a poetry, Poland/Warsaw, Nowy Świat Edition House.
 His Russian language poems are published in the moscow's literary magazine "Знамя ".

Discography
 2005 – Российские барды, диск 5; Moroz Records, Moscow.

Adaptations of Strelnikov's works
In August 2021 in Bydgoszcz (Poland), shooting for the full-length feature film “Negatyw” (“The Negative”) began – the screening of Dmitry Strelnikov's novel “Wyspa” (“The Island”). Director – Robert Wichrowski. Starring – Anita Jancia and Michał Gadomski. The premiere of the film is scheduled for 2022.

In 2009–2010 on the basis of Strelnikov's bestseller “Ruski miesiąc” / “Russian month” ("Wedding.ru"), was produced a theatrical performance (directed by Giovanny Castellanos). The premiere of the play "Russian month" ("Wedding.ru") took place on March 27, 2010, at the Aleksander Sewruk Theater in Elbląg, (Poland).

See also
 Russian literature
 List of Russian writers
 TVP2

External links
 Official website
 Strelnikoff on the Znamya magazine's website

1969 births
Living people
Russian writers
Television in Poland
Russian writers in Polish